This is a list of earthquakes in Washington, a U.S. state.

References

 Sources

 

 
Earthquakes
Washington
Tsunamis in the United States